Simen Oscar Fredrik Omang  ( 1867 –1953) was a Norwegian botanist.

He was born in Hamar, and graduated as cand.real. in 1895. He specialized in the genus Hieracium, and described several new species of the genus.

He was the father of Reidar Omang.

References

1867 births
1953 deaths
People from Hamar
20th-century Norwegian botanists
19th-century Norwegian botanists